Paolo Filippi (15 September 1962 – 4 April 2021) was an Italian politician. He served as President of the Province of Alessandria from 2004 to 2014.

Biography
After earning a law degree, Filippi served as a Municipal Councillor in Casale Monferrato from 1986 to 1995 as a member of Democracy is Freedom – The Daisy. He then was elected as a Provincial Councillor in 1997.

Filippi was elected President of the Province of Alessandria in 2004 with 50.3% of the vote, representing a center-left coalition. His coalition consisted of the Democrats of the Left, the Democratic Party, the Party of Italian Communists, the Italian Democratic Socialists, and the Communist Refoundation Party. However, Filippi collected 51.3% of the vote in the second round and securing his re-election. He did not seek re-election in 2014 and retired from his presidential role.

In 2019, Filippi left the Democratic Party to join Italia Viva.

Paolo Filippi died on 4 April 2021 at the age of 58 following a sudden illness.

References

1962 births
2021 deaths
Italian politicians
Presidents of the Province of Alessandria
Democracy is Freedom – The Daisy politicians
Democratic Party (Italy) politicians
Italia Viva politicians
People from Casale Monferrato